Ana Margarida Laíns da Silva Augusto (born 16 August 1979, in Tomar) is a Portuguese fado singer.

Discography
2006 – Sentidos (Difference)
2010 – Quatro Caminhos (Difference)
2017 – Portucalis

References

1979 births
Living people
People from Tomar

Website: http://analainsmusic.com/